Wu Hao or Hao Wu is the name of:

Wu Hao (artist) (吳昊, born 1932), Taiwanese artist
Wu Hao (footballer) (吴昊, born 1983), Chinese footballer
Hao Wu (biochemist) (吴皓), Chinese-American biochemist
Hao Wu (director) (吴皓, born 1972), Chinese-American director